In music, the Farben chord is a chord, in ascending order C–G–B–E–A, named after its use in Five Pieces for Orchestra, Op.16, No. 3, "Farben" (German: "colors") by Arnold Schoenberg. Its unordered pitch-class content in normal form is 01348 (e.g., C–C–E–E–G), its Forte number is 5-z17, in the taxonomy of Allen Forte.

The identity of the Farben chord, however, depends on ordering of its pitches in a particular voicing. It is enharmonically equivalent to a minor/major ninth chord : A–C–E–G–B.

According to Forte, Schoenberg developed the pentad canonically in "Farben" (also titled "Summer Morning by a Lake" or "Chord-Colors"), while Alban Berg used the chord as one of three on which Act I scene 2 of Wozzeck is based. The pentad is "almost octatonic" and has been called "a 'classic' atonal set type". The chord relates the movement to the other movements of the piece, with it appearing as the first chord of movement No.2 and in movement No.4, "The figure in the first bar [of op.16/IV] is actually a horizontal version of the chord from the preceding movement."

References

Chords